The , also known as , is Japan's self-regulatory film regulator. Eirin was established on the model of the now-defunct American Motion Picture Producers and Distributors Association's Production Code Administration in June 1949, succeeding the US-led occupation authorities' role of film censorship during the Occupation of Japan. It classifies films into one of four categories depending on their suitability for viewing by minors of different ages.

Description
As in other countries, Eirin classifies films to indicate their suitability for minors. It considers eight criteria, such as whether the film contains sexual or violent material, and gives the film a rating in one of four categories. Although the ratings are sometimes controversial, Eirin's defenders argue that its independence shields film makers from the more draconian alternative, government censorship.

During the opening credits (or in some cases, on the copyright screen immediately following the ending credits) of an Eirin-approved film, the Eirin logo is displayed prominently underneath or beside the movie's title. Eirin has no legal power to ban films, but the Japan Association of Theatre Owners forbids its members from screening films that haven't been classified by Eirin.

History 
During World War II the government of Japan censored films. The job of censoring was the responsibility of the Interior Ministry's Police Bureau. In time censorship was subsumed with the motions picture law of 1939. After the end of World War II, the General Headquarters of the Allied Forces who had occupied Japan took on the role of censoring movies. In 1949 Japan's motion picture industry formed its own self-regulating organization which was based on the code of the Motion Picture Producers and Distributors of America, which later became the Motion Picture Association of America.

The  was established in 1949 and was the predecessor to Eirin. The organization was criticized for hiring examiners who were part of the same movie industry that financed the organization, resulting in a conflict of interest. There was also criticism of the content of some films which came out at the time, such as Nikkatsu's Season of the Sun based on the award-winning book by Shintaro Ishihara.

In response to the criticism Eirin began to bring in outsiders to join the commission in 1956, and reorganized into a self-financing, independent body. At that time it also changed its name to Eirin Kanri Iinkai, and is the foundation of today's rating body.

Ratings

Early ratings set
From 1976 to May 1, 1998, there were three rating categories:

 - Patrons of all ages are admitted.
 - Patrons under 15 must be accompanied by a parent or guardian.
 - Only adults are admitted.

Current ratings set

On May 1, 1998, four rating categories were introduced: R15+ and R18+ are restricted categories and it is forbidden to admit an underage patron to a film with a restricted rating as well as rent, sell, or exhibit DVDs/motion picture releases to underage patrons with restricted ratings. Such violations are a criminal offense and strictly enforced.

Unrestricted

 G: General Audiences. All ages admitted.
 PG12 (PG-12): Parental Guidance Requested. Some material may be unsuitable for children under 12. Parents are advised to accompany and give guidance for their children during the film. Films with this rating can influence elementary schoolers. May contain violent content, sexual content, use of drugs as well as underage drinking, smoking or driving. Horror movies usually get this rating.

Restricted
The R15+ and R18+ ratings are age restricted. All cinemas are legally required to check the age of all patrons who wish to view an R15+ or R18+ rated film. Admitting underage patrons to such films is considered a criminal offense and can be punished with fines/imprisonment.

 R15+ (R-15): Restricted to teenagers 15 and over only. Children and pre-teenagers under the age of 15 are banned from viewing the film. Films with this rating are strongly stimulating. May contain bullying, more violent content, more sexual content, more inappropriate language and criminal activity such as the yakuza and crimes of counterfeiting.
 R18+ (R-18): Restricted to adults only. Children and teenagers under the age of 18 are banned from viewing the film. Films with this rating are extremely stimulating. May contain glamorization and graphic depiction of violence, explicit sexual activity and glamorization of the use of drugs.

See also
 Computer Entertainment Rating Organization – The Japanese rating system for video games
 Motion picture rating system
Nihon Ethics of Video Association

References

External links

http://www.midnighteye.com/interviews/kinji_fukasaku.shtml

Organizations established in 1949
Film organizations in Japan
Motion picture rating systems
Entertainment rating organizations